The White Sin is a 1924 silent romantic drama film directed by William A. Seiter and starring Madge Bellamy and John Bowers. It was distributed by Film Booking Offices of America (FBO).

Plot
As described in a review of the film in a film magazine, Hattie Lou Harkness’ (Bellamy) life with her aunt becomes unbearable and she runs away from the country home, finding employment as a maid with the wealthy Van Gores. Spencer Van Gore (Cooley) stages a mock wedding on board his yacht with the ship’s captain officiating. Learning of the trick, Hattie Lou leaves. Two years later she is out of work. Reading that the yacht has been wrecked and the party of Van Gores lost, she goes with her baby to the elder Van Gore’s home and poses as Spencer’s wife. Grant Van Gore (Bowers), a war invalid there, falls in love with her. Spencer turns up and Hattie Lou learns that the marriage was legal and binding, as the captain deliberately performed it outside the three-mile limit. Spencer dies when the Van Gore home burns, and Grant and Hattie Lou marry.

Cast

Preservation
A print is preserved in the Library of Congress.

References

External links

1924 films
American silent feature films
Films directed by William A. Seiter
Film Booking Offices of America films
American black-and-white films
American romantic drama films
1924 romantic drama films
1920s American films
Silent romantic drama films
Silent American drama films